The IAAF Indoor Permit Meetings were an annual series of indoor track and field competitions organized by the International Association of Athletics Federations (IAAF) from 1997 until the end of 2015 season. In 2016 IAAF launched the IAAF World Indoor Tour including four meetings which have all regularly held an IAAF Indoor Permit.

The series was known as the World Indoor Meetings from 2003 to 2007 before returning to its original name in 2008.

The IAAF Indoor Permit Meetings calendar was subject to change during its lifetime, with the number of meetings, the constituent meetings and the duration of the series all regularly changing from year to year. A total of seventeen meetings appeared in the history of the series, with dates ranging from mid-January to mid-March. The 2000 and 2001 series had the highest number of meetings (12) while the final series had the least (5). The Russian Winter Meeting in Moscow, Birmingham Indoor Grand Prix in Birmingham, and XL Galan in Stockholm were present in every edition of the series. The meetings were mostly in Europe, with the exceptions being the Millrose Games, Boston Indoor Games and Grand Prix d’Athlétisme de Montréal in North America, and the Gunma International in Japan.

Editions

Meetings

The 2012 New York City leg was the U.S. Open Track and Field meet at Madison Square Garden. The Millrose Games moved to the Fort Washington Avenue Armory that year.

References

 
Indoor Permit Meetings
Annual athletics series
Indoor track and field competitions
Defunct athletics competitions
Recurring sporting events established in 1997
Recurring sporting events disestablished in 2015